Jon Elissalde is a French professional rugby union player. He plays at full back for Bayonne in the Top 14.

References

External links
Ligue Nationale De Rugby Profile
European Professional Club Rugby Profile
Bayonne Profile

Living people
1992 births
French rugby union players
Rugby union fullbacks